Vostok is a rural locality (a village) in Kuzhbakhtinsky Selsoviet, Ilishevsky District, Bashkortostan, Russia. The population was 29 as of 2010. There is 1 street.

Geography 
Vostok is located 41 km northeast of Verkhneyarkeyevo (the district's administrative centre) by road. Gremuchy Klyuch is the nearest rural locality.

References 

Rural localities in Ilishevsky District